= Robby Bubble =

Soft drink

- Type: Soft drink
- Introduced: 1994; 32 years ago
- Alcohol by volume: 0%

Robby Bubble is a sparkling soft drink aimed at children and was first produced by Schloss Wachenheim in 1994. Since then production of Robby Bubble has expanded significantly and is currently exporting to four continents apart from Germany alone.

== Varieties ==
The 16 varieties of Robby Bubble are:

- Robby Bubble Strawberry 0.75l
- Robby Bubble Peach 0.75l
- Robby Bubble Cherry 0.75l
- Robby Bubble Raspberry 0.75l
- Robby Bubble Tropical 0.75l
- Robby Bubble Watermelon 0.75l
- Robby Bubble Orange & Mango 0.75l
- Robby Bubble Magic-drink 0.75l
- Robby Bubble Grapes (two version - green and white) 0.75l
- Robby Bubble Jungle Party 0.75l
- Robby Bubble Apple-Cherry 0.75l
- Robby Bubble Berry 0.75l
- Robby Bubble Cherry 0.75l
- Robby Bubble Kinder-Punsch 0.75l
- Robby Bubble Peach 1.5l
- Robby Bubble Strawberry 1.5l

The Raspberry version marketed specifically at girls and is designed so as to complement pink party themes.

== Controversy ==
There was a minor controversy in 2007 over the placement of Robby Bubble in certain liquor stores in Alberta, Canada.
